Władysław III (31 October 1424 – 10 November 1444), also known as Ladislaus of Varna, was King of Poland and the Supreme Duke (Supremus Dux) of Grand Duchy of Lithuania from 1434 as well as King of Hungary and Croatia from 1440 until his death at the Battle of Varna. He was the eldest son of Władysław II Jagiełło, King of Poland and Grand Duke of Lithuania, and the Lithuanian noblewoman Sophia of Halshany.

Władysław III of Varna is known in Hungarian as I. Ulászló; in Polish as Władysław III Warneńczyk; in Slovak as Vladislav I; in Czech as Vladislav Varnenčík; in Bulgarian as Владислав Варненчик (Vladislav Varnenchik); in Lithuanian as Vladislovas III (or Vladislovas Varnietis); in Croatian as Vladislav I. Jagelović.

Royal title 
Latin: Ladislaus Dei Gratia Poloniae, Hungariae, Dalmatiae, Croatiae, Rascia etc. rex necnon terrarum Cracouie, Sandomirie, Syradie, Lancicie, Cuyauie, Lithuaniae princeps supremus, Pomeraniae, Russieque dominus et heres etc.

English: Vladislaus by the Grace of God king of Poland, Hungary, Dalmatia, Croatia, Rascia (Serbian Grand Principality) and lands of Kraków, Sandomierz, Sieradz, Łęczyca, Kuyavia, Supreme Prince of Lithuania, lord and heir of Pomerania and Ruthenia

Early life

Władysław was the first-born son of Władysław II Jagiełło and Sophia of Halshany. He ascended the throne at the age of ten and was immediately surrounded by a group of advisors headed by Cardinal Zbigniew Oleśnicki, who wanted to continue to enjoy his high status at court. In spite of that, the young ruler and his ambitious mother were aware that there was opposition to them. In 1427, the Polish nobility initiated an anti-Jagiellonian opposition and attempted to have Władysław II Jagiełło's sons Władysław III and Casimir IV Jagiellon declared illegitimate to the Polish throne as they had no blood link to the previous ruling Polish dynasty, the Piasts. Despite the agreements signed between Władysław II and the Polish magnates to ensure the succession for his sons, the opposition wanted another candidate for the Polish throne: Frederick of Brandenburg, who was betrothed to Hedwig, Jagiełło's daughter by his second wife. However, the conspiracy was resolved by the death of the princess, rumoured to have been poisoned by Queen Sophia.

Politics and military career

King of Poland
The young king's reign was difficult from the very outset. His coronation was interrupted by a hostile nobleman, Spytko III of Melsztyn. On the next day, the customary homage of the townsfolk of Kraków did not take place due to a dispute between the temporal and spiritual lords of Mazovia over their place in the retinue. Neither did Władysław have much to say later about matters of state, which were run by the powerful cleric and chancellor Oleśnicki. The situation did not change even after the Sejm (Polish parliament) had gathered in Piotrków in 1438, and declared the fourteen-year-old king to have attained his majority.

King of Hungary and Croatia
This situation continued until 1440, when Władysław was offered the crown of Hungary. However, accepting it would have led to numerous problems. Hungary was under a growing threat from the Ottoman Empire, and some Polish magnates did not want to agree to the king of Poland also being the monarch of Hungary, while Elisabeth, widow of the deceased King of Hungary, Albert II of Germany, attempted to keep the crown for her yet unborn child. Such inconveniences aside, Władysław finally took the Hungarian throne, having engaged in a two-year civil war against Elisabeth. He had received significant support from Pope Eugene IV, in exchange for his help in organising an anti-Muslim crusade. The eighteen-year-old king, although thus far a king solely by title, became deeply involved in the war against the Ottomans, having been brought up in the standard of a pious Christian monarch and ideal Christian knight, and paid no heed to the interests of Poland and of the Jagiellonian dynasty.

Crusade against Muslim Ottomans and Death at Varna

The "bulwark of Christianity" and other slogans put forward by the papal envoy Giuliano Cesarini, together with much more reasonable but only verbal promises of Venetian and papal fleets blockading the Dardanelles Straits, along with an enticing vision of a promise of victory in the Crusade of Varna against the Muslims, persuaded Władysław to engage his freshly victorious forces for another season of war, thus breaching the ten-year truce with the aggressive and still powerful Ottoman Empire. Despite their alleged forthcoming help, the Venetian fleet carried the Muslim army from Asia into Europe but failed to sail to Varna, a surprising move that Władysław and his most senior military commander John Hunyadi failed to anticipate. The Venetian treachery placed the huge Muslim army (60,000) under sultan Murad II in close proximity to the unsuspecting crusaders (20,000). As a result, when the Battle of Varna began on 10 November 1444, the Polish king and his multi-ethnic subjects did not sense that this would be for many of them their final fight. Facing the desperate circumstance the king, seeing the experienced Hunyadi fight and break the Sipahi cavalry, decided to gamble and directly attack the sultan, who was protected by the guard cavalry and formidable Janissary infantry. The young king was killed while personally leading his own 500-strong royal Polish heavy cavalry company, his charge losing impetus and coming to a standstill amongst the unyielding Janissaries protecting the sultan. The Janissaries killed the king's bodyguard and beheaded Władysław, displaying his head on a pole. Disheartened by the death of their king, the Hungarian army fled the battlefield. Neither the king's body nor his armor were ever found.

Personal life

Władysław III had no children and did not marry. The chronicler Jan Długosz, known for his antipathy towards the king and his father, alleged that there was something unusual about Władysław's sexuality, though Długosz did not specify what: "too subject to his carnal desires", "he did not abandon his lewd and despicable habits". Długosz wrote about him some sentences later: "No age has ever seen and will never see a more Catholic and holy ruler who, according to his highest goodness, has never harmed any Christian. [...] Finally, like a holy king and a second angel on Earth, he lived an unmarried and virgin life at home and during the war."

Władysław was succeeded in the Kingdom of Poland by his younger brother, Duke Casimir IV of Lithuania, in 1447, after a three-year interregnum. In Hungary he was succeeded by his former rival, the child-king Ladislaus the Posthumous.

Legend

According to a Portuguese legend Władysław survived the Battle of Varna (although the Ottomans claimed to have his head, his body in royal armor was never found) and then journeyed in secrecy to the Holy Land. He became a knight of Saint Catharine of Mount Sinai (O Cavaleiro de Santa Catarina) and then he settled on Madeira. King Afonso V of Portugal granted him the lands in Madalena do Mar district of the Madeira Islands, for the rest of his life. He was known there as Henrique Alemão (Henry the German) and married Senhorinha Anes (the King of Portugal was his best man), who gave him two sons. He established a church of Saint Catherine and Saint Mary Magdalene in Madalena do Mar (1471). There he was depicted in a painting as Saint Joachim meeting Saint Anne at the Golden Gate on a painting by Master of the Adoration of Machico (Mestre da Adoração de Machico) in the beginning of the 16th century.

According to the tradition, he felt his defeat at Varna was a warning sign from God (since he declared war on a false pretext, violating the truce with the Ottoman Muslims). Thus he wandered as a pilgrim, seeking forgiveness, which he found in Jerusalem. For the rest of his life he would deny his identity. A delegation of Polish monks went to Madeira to question him and certified he was in fact the long lost king, now living in secrecy. He declined their suggestion to ascend the Polish throne again.

According to another version of the legend, promoted by Manuel da Silva Rosa, Władysław (as Henrique Alemão) was the real father of Christopher Columbus.

Remembrance
Following his death, Władysław III was commemorated in many songs and poems.

A main boulevard and residential district in Varna are named after Warneńczyk. In 1935 a park-museum, Władysław Warneńczyk, was opened in Varna, with a symbolic cenotaph of Władysław III built atop of an ancient Thracian mound tomb. There has also been a soccer team named Vladislav Varna (now PFC Cherno More Varna).

Gallery

See also
 History of Poland (1385–1569)
 List of Polish monarchs

Notes

References
K. Łukasiewicz, Władysław Warneńczyk, Krzyżacy i Kawaler Św Katarzyny, Warszawa 2010

External links
 

 
 

 
 

1424 births
1444 deaths
15th-century Polish monarchs
Polish Roman Catholics
Kings of Hungary
Kings of Croatia
Jagiellonian dynasty
People of the Hussite Wars
History of Varna, Bulgaria
Monarchs killed in action
Polish military personnel killed in action
Medieval child monarchs
Christians of the Crusade of Varna
Burials at Wawel Cathedral